Taaffe O'Connell (born May 14, 1951) is an American actress and publisher, best known by her fans for her performance in cult-classic sci-fi horror film Galaxy of Terror.  Her acting career began in the late 1970s and continued uninterrupted through the 1980s. Her career has seen a rebirth after 2000 and has continued to the present day.

Apart from acting, O'Connell started and owned the Canoco Publishing Company during the 1990s. Canoco is a Los Angeles-based company produced Astro Caster Magazine, which specialized in casting information and advice for actors and actresses. O'Connell has written numerous articles for the magazine as well as being its owner and publisher.

Life and career
O'Connell was born in Providence, Rhode Island. O'Connell's early career consisted primarily of TV show appearances (Three's Company, Happy Days, Dallas, Laverne & Shirley, Blansky's Beauties). In 1980 she starred in the slasher cult film New Year's Evil.

Role in Galaxy of Terror
She achieved lasting fame within the B-movie, horror film universe for her role as Dameia in Galaxy of Terror. Released in 1981, it was the second consecutive horror film she had appeared in, having also appeared in the 1980 film New Year's Evil. O'Connell's place as a scream queen legend was guaranteed with Galaxy of Terror due to the unique, bizarre, and exploitative scene in which her character is killed.

Trapped on an alien world, her character and fellow shipmates find themselves in a giant pyramid built by an ancient culture who used it as a mental playground/testing area for their children. The human crew unwittingly confront the pyramid, which creates monsters from the fears in their own minds, but the monsters come with more adult, psychological fears attached to them as well. The confrontations generally prove deadly to the crew since most of them are not aware of this and cannot overcome the sense of terror and humiliation generated by their attackers. O'Connell's character, Dameia, reveals at one point she has a significant fear of worms. Shortly thereafter, she is attacked by a giant 12-foot maggot. Instead of simply devouring and killing her, as it seems to initially be intent on doing, it instead throws her to the floor, lowers over her, rips the remainder of her uniform completely off, and begins to rape her. Either rape or the prospect of sexual domination is Dameia's true fear, because she stops trying to fight off the attack and instead submits to it, her terrified screams becoming increasingly aroused moans until she is loudly and visibly climaxed. With her limbs splayed out underneath and her body spasming uncontrollably, she dies while the worm grinds away on top of her. Later, her naked body and ripped uniform remains are discovered by her shocked and disgusted crewmates, with the only other clue as to what happened to her being the large amount of slime her body, soaked hair to feet, lies in.

The scene as it was released contained enough nudity from the buxom O'Connell (and a body-double used for various shots) and was sexually explicit enough to achieve cult status for the movie and the actress. According to R. J. Kizer on the 2010 Shout! Factory re-release of Galaxy, it was initially even more explicit; in fact, it earned an X-rating from the Motion Picture Association of America (MPAA) upon the screening of its first cut. Kizer had to make a series of small edits to eliminate two things the MPAA gave the scene an X-rating for: some of Dameia's facial expressions as she's raped were too "ecstatic" and deemed suggestive or inappropriate, and some of the motions made by the giant worm and the nude actress entangled in tentacles underneath it simulated sexual intercourse too realistically. These tiny cuts allowed the film to maintain its desired R-rating, but even so, the sequence was restricted or the movie was banned from cinematic release in several countries for the lewd sexual content of this scene. Over time, the cut sequences were lost and are not on any currently released version of the film.

As a result of this, O'Connell has had cameo appearances in several other horror films in the 1990s and early 2000s, and B-movie print productions like Femme Fatales and Fangoria have done features on her, the scene, and the film. O'Connell herself has a prominent role in the commentary of the DVD/Blu-ray release, as well as in its companion feature "Tales from the Lumber Yard" which discusses the making of the film.

Recent years
During the 1990s, O'Connell's focus shifted away from acting and into publishing. Her Canoco Publishing Company has continued operations for 20 years, and produces Astro Caster Magazine, a trade magazine which combines traditional casting for actors and actresses with astrological insights and information.

More recently, O'Connell has begun taking acting parts in films again. She has appeared in three films, Spork, Going Down in LA-LA Land and the box-office hit The Change-Up. Her roles in these films have been more comedic than dramatic, similar to her roles on Three's Company and the mid-1980s film Hot Chili.

Filmography
Blansky's Beauties (1977, TV Series) - Hillary S. Prentiss
CHiPs (1979, TV Series) - Crystal
The New Adventures of Wonder Woman (1979, TV series) - Val
Rocky II (1979) - Ring Girl (uncredited)
The Incredible Hulk (1980, TV Series) - Miss Farber
New Year's Evil (1980) - Jane
Galaxy of Terror (1981) - Dameia
Caged Fury (1983) - Honey
Knight Rider (1984, TV Series) - Denise Reynolds
Hot Chili (1985) - Brigitte
Dallas (1990, TV Series) - Honey North
The Stoneman (2002) - Hooker #1
Dismembered (2003) - Duty Nurse
Spork (2010) - Mrs. Byotch
Going Down in LA-LA Land (2011) - Job Interviewer
The Change-Up (2011) - Mona

References

External links

Article in French about Taaffe O'Connell

1951 births
American film actresses
American television actresses
Living people
Actors from Providence, Rhode Island
Actresses from Rhode Island
American publishers (people)
20th-century American actresses
21st-century American actresses
21st-century American women